The Heart Keeper is a 2019 Nordic noir psychological novel by Norwegian author Alex Dahl. It was published in English in 2019 by Berkley Books, a Penguin Random House imprint. Set in Norway, it tells the story of the loss of a child through the eyes of two different women. Critic Paul Burke described it as "a powerful study of grief and loss, guilt, recriminations, trauma and PTSD, and survival." Norwegian newspaper Dagbladet described Dahl in 2019 as a new star of Nordic noir literature.

Background
Dahl attributes the inspiration for The Heart Keeper to "an incident years ago when the life of her first child was saved by the neo-natal care unit at Ullevål University Hospital."

References

2019 novels
21st-century Norwegian novels
Novels set in Norway
Psychological novels
Berkley Books books
Head of Zeus books